Ervil Morrell LeBaron (February 22, 1925 – August 15, 1981) was the leader of a polygamous Mormon fundamentalist group who ordered the killings of many of his opponents, using the religious doctrine of blood atonement to justify the murders. He was sentenced to life in prison for orchestrating the murder of an opponent, and died there in 1981.

He had at least 13 wives in a plural marriage, several of whom he married while they were still underage, and several of whom were involved in the murders.

History

After the Church of Jesus Christ of Latter-day Saints (LDS Church) officially abandoned the practice of polygamy in 1890, some polygamous Mormons, who were later excommunicated from the LDS Church, moved south to Mexico to continue the practice without the interference of U.S. law enforcement.  Alma Dayer LeBaron, Sr. was one of these people, and in 1924 moved his family, which included his two wives and eight children, to northern Mexico.  There, the family started a farm called "Colonia LeBaron" in Galeana, Chihuahua.

When Alma died in 1951, he passed the leadership of the community on to his son Joel LeBaron. Joel eventually incorporated the community as the Church of the Firstborn of the Fulness of Times in Salt Lake City, Utah.  Joel's younger brother, Ervil LeBaron, was his second in command during the early years of the church's existence. The group ultimately numbered around 30 families who lived in both Utah and a community called "Los Molinos" on the Baja California Peninsula.

Killings

In 1972, the brothers split over leadership of the Church of the Firstborn of the Fulness of Times, and Ervil started the Church of the First Born of the Lamb of God in San Diego, California. That year, Ervil ordered the murder of Joel in Mexico. Leadership of the Baja California church passed to the youngest LeBaron brother, Verlan, whom Ervil tried to have killed over the next decade.  In 1974, Ervil was tried and convicted in Mexico for Joel's murder. His conviction was overturned on a technicality; some have alleged this was as a result of a bribe.  Ervil's followers subsequently raided Los Molinos in an effort to kill Verlan— who was in Nicaragua—but the town was destroyed and two men were killed.

Ervil LeBaron's attention was also focused on rival polygamous leaders. In April 1975, he ordered the killing of Bob Simons, a polygamist who sought to minister to Native Americans.  In 1977, LeBaron ordered the killing of Rulon C. Allred, leader of the Apostolic United Brethren, another Mormon fundamentalist sect. Ervil LeBaron's 13th wife, Rena Chynoweth, carried out the murder with Ervil's stepdaughter, Ramona Marston. Although Chynoweth was tried and acquitted for Allred's murder, she confessed in her memoir, The Blood Covenant (1990). She also described her experiences in LeBaron's group, which she characterized as using mind control and fear to control its followers.

Ervil LeBaron also ordered the murders of members of his own family and those of his supporters. His 10th wife, Vonda White, was convicted and sentenced to life in prison for the murder of Dean Grover Vest, one of LeBaron's henchmen, who had attempted to leave the church. Vonda White is also said to have killed Noemi Zarate Chynoweth, the plural wife of Ervil's father-in-law through his wife, Lorna Chynoweth. Noemi had been critical of Ervil LeBaron's practices and snubbed him at her wedding to Bud Chynoweth. According to witnesses, Thelma Chynoweth (Bud Chynoweth's first wife who was Lorna's mother and Noemi's sister-wife) helped kill Noemi.  Ervil LeBaron has also been linked to the death of his own 17-year-old daughter Rebecca, who was pregnant with her second child and hoped to leave the group; it is alleged that his stepson Eddie Marston and brother-in-law Duane Chynoweth strangled her in April 1977.

On June 1, 1979, Ervil LeBaron was apprehended by police in Mexico and extradited to the United States, where he was convicted of having ordered Allred's death. In 1980, he was sentenced to life imprisonment at the Utah State Prison in Draper, Utah, where he died on August 16, 1981 from an apparent suicide.  Ervil's brother Verlan (whom Ervil had tried to murder) died in an auto accident in Mexico City two days after Ervil's body was discovered in his cell. In an October 2012 interview with Vice Magazine, Verlan LeBaron's grandson Brent LeBaron stated that at least some in the LeBaron family believe that this may not have been a coincidence.

Aftermath
While in prison, LeBaron wrote a 400-page "bible" known as The Book of the New Covenants, which included a commandment to kill disobedient church members who were included in a hit list written by LeBaron. Some 20 copies were printed and distributed.

Three of the murders were carried out simultaneously on June 27, 1988, at 4:00 pm. Duane Chynoweth, one of LeBaron's former followers, was shot and killed with his 8-year-old daughter, Jennifer, while running errands. Eddie Marston, one of LeBaron's stepsons and former thugs, was killed in the same manner, and Mark Chynoweth, a father of six, was shot multiple times in his office in Houston, Texas.

Of the seven killers involved in the  "4 O’Clock Murders," five were found guilty of murder. One, Cynthia LeBaron, testified against her siblings and was granted immunity. The final suspect, Jacqueline LeBaron, was captured by the FBI in May 2010. 

On June 16, 2011, Jacqueline Tarsa LeBaron pleaded guilty to conspiracy to obstruct religious beliefs and faced a 5-year maximum sentence in a future sentencing hearing. She released from federal custody on several months earlier than her original sentence was calculated. Although her plea agreement is public information, many docket entries are sealed. Since release, one 2014 report from a U.S. Probation Officer about her supervised release states that Jacqueline Tarsa LeBaron had not made any payment toward the $134,000 restitution imposed by the Court; simultaneously, the officer's report states that she "has severe mental health issues" including mania requiring psychotropic medication and which have led her to seek Social Security Disability Insurance.

It has been estimated that more than 25 people were killed as a result of LeBaron's prison-cell orders. Many of his family members and other ex-members of the group still remain in hiding for fear of retribution from LeBaron's remaining followers. However, when LeBaron's daughter Anna LeBaron, who escaped from the cult aged 13, published an account of her life and the cult in 2017, when she was 48, she said that the blood-letting was over and family members were no longer in danger.

Wives and children
Ervil LeBaron married 13 women and fathered more than 50 children.  He also raised several stepchildren.

* stepchild

+ Chynoweth sibling

++ Rios sibling

!cult leader

i Incest

Depictions
 Films
 , directed by Jud Taylor

 Television
 
 

Nonfiction

See also
 Factional breakdown: Mormon fundamentalist sects
 Mormon fundamentalism
 List of Mormon fundamentalist churches
 List of Mormon fundamentalist leaders

Notes

References

Bradlee, Jr., Ben, and Dale Van Atta (1981) Prophet of Blood: The Untold Story of Ervil Lebaron and the Lambs of God. Putnam, 
Krakauer, Jon (2003) Under the Banner of Heaven : A Story of Violent Faith, pp. 266–277.

Spencer, Irene (2009) Cult Insanity: A Memoir of Polygamy, Prophets, and Blood Atonement.
 "A Deadly 'Messenger of God'", Time, Aug. 29, 1977.
 Utah Attorney General's Office and Arizona Attorney General's Office, The Primer: A Guidebook for Law Enforcement and Human Services Agencies Who Offer Assistance to Fundamentalist Mormon Families, updated Aug. 2009.

External links

, featuring a section on Ervil LeBaron.

American Latter Day Saint leaders
Mexican Latter Day Saints
Mormon fundamentalist leaders
1925 births
1981 deaths
20th-century criminals
American people convicted of murder
American people who died in prison custody
American prisoners sentenced to life imprisonment
Cult leaders
Members of the clergy convicted of murder
People from Chihuahua (state)
People from the Mormon colonies in Mexico
People convicted of murder by Utah
Prisoners sentenced to life imprisonment by Utah
Prisoners who died in Utah detention
Religiously motivated violence in Mexico
Mormonism and violence
Ervil
American members of the clergy convicted of crimes
Child marriage in the United States